Andrew Thomas Mlugu (born November 12, 1995) is a Tanzanian judoka. He competed at the 2016 Summer Olympics in the men's 73 kg event, in which he was eliminated in the second round by Jake Bensted. He was the flag bearer for Tanzania in the Parade of Nations.

References

External links
 

1995 births
Living people
Tanzanian male judoka
Olympic judoka of Tanzania
Judoka at the 2016 Summer Olympics